Financial literacy is the possession of the set of skills and knowledge that allows an individual to make informed and effective decisions with all of their financial resources. Raising interest in personal finance is now a focus of state-run programs in countries including Australia, Canada, Japan, the United States, and the United Kingdom. Understanding basic financial concepts allows people to know how to navigate in the financial system. People with appropriate financial literacy training make better financial decisions and manage money better than those without such training.

The Organization for Economic Co-operation and Development (OECD) started an inter-governmental project in 2003 with the objective of providing ways to improve financial education and literacy standards through the development of common financial literacy principles. In March 2008, the OECD launched the International Gateway for Financial Education, which aims to serve as a clearinghouse for financial education programs, information and research worldwide. In the UK, the alternative term "financial capability" is used by the state and its agencies: the Financial Services Authority (FSA) in the UK started a national strategy on financial capability in 2003. The US government established its Financial Literacy and Education Commission in 2003.

Definitions of financial literacy 
There is a diversity of definitions used by NGOs, think tanks, and advocacy groups but in its broadest sense financial literacy is an awareness or understanding of money. Some of the definitions below are closely aligned with “skills and knowledge”, whereas others take broader views: 
 The Government Accountability Office definition (2010) is “the ability to make informed judgments and to take effective actions regarding the current and future use and management of money. It includes the ability to understand financial choices, plan for the future, spend wisely, and manage the challenges associated with life events such as a job loss, saving for retirement, or paying for a child’s education”.
 The Financial Literacy and Education Commission (2020) includes a notion of personal capability in its definition as “the skills, knowledge and tools that equip people to make individual financial decisions and actions to attain their goals; this may also be known as financial capability, especially when paired with access to financial products and services.”.
 The National Financial Educators Council adds a psychological component defining financial literacy as “possessing the skills and knowledge on financial matters to confidently take effective action that best fulfills an individual’s personal, family and global community goals.”
 The OECD's Programme for International Student Assessment (PISA) in 2018 published a definition in two parts. The first part refers to kinds of thinking and behaviour, while the second part refers to the purposes for developing the particular literacy. “Financial literacy is the knowledge and understanding of financial concepts and risks, and the skills, motivation and confidence to apply such knowledge and understanding in order to make effective decisions across a range of financial contexts, to improve the financial well-being of individuals and society, and to enable participation in economic life”.

International findings 
An international OECD study was published in late 2005 analysing financial literacy surveys in OECD countries. A selection of findings included:
 In Australia, 67 percent of respondents indicated that they understood the concept of compound interest, yet when they were asked to solve a problem using the concept only 28 percent had a good level of understanding.
 A British survey found that consumers do not actively seek out financial information. The information they do receive is acquired by chance, for example, by picking up a pamphlet at a bank or having a chance talk with a bank employee.
 A Canadian survey found that respondents considered choosing the right investments to be more stressful than going to the dentist.
 A survey of Korean high-school students showed that they had failing scores—that is, they answered fewer than 60 percent of the questions correctly—on tests designed to measure their ability to choose and manage a credit card, their knowledge about saving and investing for retirement, and their awareness of risk and the importance of insuring against it.
 A survey in the US found that four out of ten American workers are not saving for retirement.

"Yet it is encouraging that the few financial education programmes which have been evaluated have been found to be reasonably effective. Research in the US shows that workers increase their participation in 401(k) plans (a type of retirement plan, with special tax advantages, which allows employees to save and invest for their own retirement) when employers offer financial education programmes, whether in the form of brochures or seminars."

However, academic analyses of financial education have found no evidence of measurable success at improving participants' financial well-being.

According to 2014 Asian Development Bank survey, more Mongolians have expanded their financial options, and for instance now compare the interest rates of loans and savings services through the successful launch of the TV drama with focus on the fiscal literacy of poor and non-poor vulnerable households. Given that 80% of Mongolians cited TV as their main source of information, TV serial dramas were identified as the most effective vehicle for messages on financial literacy.

Asia–Pacific, Middle East, and Africa 
A survey of women consumers across Asia Pacific Middle East Africa (APMEA) comprises basic money management, financial planning and investment. The top ten of APMEA Women MasterCard's Financial Literacy Index are Thailand 73.9, New Zealand 71.3, Australia 70.2, Vietnam 70.1, Singapore 69.4, Taiwan 68.7, Philippines 68.2, Hong Kong 68.0, Indonesia 66.5 and Malaysia 66.0.

Australia 
The Australian Government established a National Consumer and Financial Literacy Taskforce in 2004, which recommended the establishment of the Financial Literacy Foundation in 2005. In 2008, the functions of the Foundation were transferred to the Australian Securities and Investments Commission (ASIC). The Australian Government also runs a range of programs (such as Money Management) to improve the financial literacy of its Indigenous population, particularly those living in remote communities.

In 2011 ASIC released a National Financial Literacy Strategy—informed by an earlier ASIC research report 'Financial Literacy and Behavioural Change'—to enhance the financial wellbeing of all Australians by improving financial literacy levels. The strategy has four pillars:
 Education
 Trusted and independent information, tools and support
 Additional solutions to drive improved financial wellbeing and behavioural change
 Partnerships with the sectors involved with financial literacy, measuring its impact and promoting best practice

ASIC's MoneySmart website was one of the key initiatives in the government's strategy. It replaced the FIDO and Understanding Money websites.

ASIC also has a MoneySmart Teaching website for teachers and educators. It provides professional learning and other resources to help educators integrate consumer and financial literacy into teaching and learning programs.

The Know Risk Network of web and phone apps, newsletters, videos and website was developed by insurance membership body ANZIIF to educate consumers on insurance and risk management.

India 
National Centre for Financial Education (NCFE), a non-profit company, was created under section 8 of companies act 2013, to promote financial literacy in India. It is promoted by four major financial regulators Reserve Bank of India, SEBI, IRDA and PFRDA.

NCFE conducted a benchmark survey of financial literacy in 2015 to find the level of financial awareness in India. It organises various programs to improve the financial literacy including collaborating with schools and developing new curriculum to include financial management concepts. It also conducts a yearly financial literacy test. The list of topics covered by NCFE in its awareness programs includes investments, types of bank accounts, services offered by banks, Aadhaar card, demat account, pan cards, power of compounding, digital payments, protection against financial frauds etc.

Saudi Arabia 
A nationwide survey was conducted by SEDCO Holding in Saudi Arabia in 2012 to understand the level of financial literacy in the youth. The survey involved a thousand young Saudi nationals, and the results showed that only 11 percent kept track of their spending, although 75 percent thought they understood the basics of money management. An in-depth analysis of SEDCO's survey revealed that 45 percent of youngsters did not save any money at all, while only 20 percent saved 10 percent of their monthly income. In terms of spending habits, the study indicated that items such as mobile phones and travel accounted for nearly 80 percent of purchases. Regarding financing their lifestyle, 46 percent of youth relied on their parents to fund big ticket items. 90 percent of the respondents stated that they were interested in increasing their financial knowledge.

Singapore 
In Singapore, the National Institute of Education Singapore established the inaugural Financial Literacy Hub for Teachers in 2007 to empower school teachers to infuse financial literacy into core curriculum subjects to embed pedagogically sound activities to engage students in learning. Such day-today relevant and authentic illustrations enhance the experiential learning to build financial capability in youth. Integral to evidence-based practices in schools, research on financial literacy is spearheaded by the Hub, which has published numerous impact studies on the effectiveness of financial literacy programs and on the perceptions and attitudes of teachers and students.

The Singapore government through the Monetary Authority of Singapore funded the setting up of the Institute for Financial Literacy in July 2012. The institute is managed jointly by MoneySENSE (a national financial education programme) and the Singapore Polytechnic. This Institute aims to build core financial capabilities across a broad spectrum of the Singapore population by providing free and unbiased financial education programmes to working adults and their families. From July 2012 to May 2017, the Institute reached out to more than 110,000 people in Singapore via workshops and talks.

Europe

France 
In 2016, France introduced a national economic, budgetary and financial education (EDUFI) strategy based on OECD principles. The government designated the Banque de France as the national operator in charge of implementing the policy.

This government-led strategy aims to promote financial literacy in French society. Measures include financial education and budget planning courses for young people. Entrepreneurs and financially vulnerable individuals also receive support to develop skills in this area.

The Banque de France conducts periodic surveys on the level of understanding, attitudes and behaviour of the French population regarding budgetary and financial matters. It also carries out awareness-raising measures on topics such as overindebtedness, bank inclusion schemes, means of payment, bank accounts, credit, savings and insurance.

The Cité de l'Économie opened to the public in June 2019. This institution is the first French museum dedicated entirely to fostering economic literacy in an instructive and entertaining way. It is funded by the Banque de France in cooperation with several partners, including the Ministry for Education, the Institut pour l’Éducation Financière du Public (IEFP – Institute for Public Financial Education) and the Bibliothèque Nationale de France.

Belgium 
The FSMA is tasked with contributing to better financial literacy of savers and investors that will enable individual savers, insured persons, shareholders and investors in Belgium to be in a better position in their relationships with their financial institutions. As a result, they will be less likely to purchase products that are not suited to their profile.

Switzerland 
A study measured financial literacy among 1500 households in German-speaking Switzerland. Testing the three concepts compound interest, inflation, and risk diversification, results show that the level of financial literacy in Switzerland is high compared to results for other European countries or the US population. Results of the study further show that higher financial literacy is correlated with financial market participation and mortgage borrowing. A related study among 15-year-old students in the Canton of Fribourg shows substantial differences in the level of financial literacy between French- and German speaking students.

The Swiss National Bank aims at improving financial literacy through its initiative iconomix that targets upper secondary school students.
The new public school curriculum will cover financial literacy in public schools.

United Kingdom 
The UK has a dedicated body to promote financial capabilitythe Money Advice Service.

The Financial Services Act 2010 included a provision for the FSA to establish the Consumer Financial Education Body, known as CFEB. From April 26, 2010, CFEB continued the work of the FSA's Financial Capability Division independently of the FSA, and on April 4, 2011, was rebranded as the Money Advice Service.

The strategy previously involved the FSA spending about £10 million a year across a seven-point plan. The priority areas were:
 New parents
 Schools (a programme being delivered by pfeg)
 Young adults
 Workplace
 Consumer communications
 Online tools
 Money advice

A baseline survey conducted 5,300 interviews across the UK in 2005. The report identified four themes:
 Many people are failing to plan ahead
 Many people are taking on financial risks without realising it
 Problems of debt are severe for a small proportion of the population, and many more people may be affected in an economic downturn
 The under-40s are, on average, less financially capable than their elders

"In short, unless steps are taken to improve levels of financial capability, we are storing up trouble for the future."

There are also numerous charities in the United Kingdom working to improve financial literacy such as MyBnk, Citizens Advice Bureau and the Personal Finance Education Group.

Financial literacy within the UK's armed forces is provided through the MoneyForce program, run by the Royal British Legion in association with the Ministry of Defence and the Money Advice Service.

Americas

Canada 
In 2006, Canadian securities regulators commissioned two national investor surveys to gauge people's knowledge and experience with investments and fraud. The results from both studies demonstrated there is a need better to educate and inform investors about capital markets and investment fraud. Education in this area is particularly important as investors take on more risk and responsibility of managing their retirement savings, and a large baby boomer population enters the retirement years across North America.

In 2005, the British Columbia Securities Commission (BCSC) funded the Eron Mortgage Study. It was the first systematic study of a single investment fraud, focusing on more than 2,200 Eron Mortgage investors. Among other things, the report identified that investors approaching retirement without adequate resources and affluent middle-aged men were vulnerable to investment fraud. The report suggests investor education will become even more important as the baby boomer generation enters retirement.

In Canada, Financial Literacy Month takes place during the month of November to encourage Canadians to take control of their financial well-being and invest into their financial futures by learning about topics of personal finance. Canada has also established a government entity to "promotes financial education and raises consumers' awareness of their rights and responsibilities". The agency also "ensures federally regulated financial entities comply with consumer protection measures.

United States 
In the US, a national nonprofit organization, the Jump$tart Coalition for Personal Financial Literacy, is a collection of corporate, academic, non-profit and government organizations that work for financial education since 1995.

Another national nonprofit organization in the US, the National Association of Investors (NAIC), has focused their financial literacy efforts specifically on investment education since 1951.

The United States Department of the Treasury established its Office of Financial Education in 2002; and the US Congress established the Financial Literacy and Education Commission under the Financial Literacy and Education Improvement Act in 2003. The Commission published its National Strategy on Financial Literacy in 2006.

While many organizations have supported the financial literacy movement, they may differ on their definitions of financial literacy. In a report by the President's Advisory Council on Financial Literacy, the authors called for a consistent definition of financial literacy by which financial literacy education programs can be judged. They defined financial literacy as "the ability to use knowledge and skills to manage financial resources effectively for a lifetime of financial well-being."

The Council for Economic Education (CEE) conducted a 2009 Survey of the States and found that 44 states currently have K-12 personal finance education or guidelines in place. However, "only 17 states require high school students to take a course in personal finance."

The Center For Financial Literacy at Champlain College conducts a biannual survey of statewide high school financial literacy requirements across the nation. The 2017 survey found that Utah had the highest state requirement in the nation, while in Alaska, Delaware, Washington, District of Columbia, Hawaii, Rhode Island and South Dakota, students are entirely dependent on the initiative of their local school board.

In July 2010, the United States Congress passed the Dodd-Frank Wall Street Reform and Consumer Protection Act (Dodd-Frank Act), which created the Consumer Financial Protection Bureau (CFPB). The CFPB has been tasked, among other mandates, with promoting financial education through its Consumer Engagement & Education group.

Brazil 
Between 2018 and 2019, surveys were performed for a myriad of players in the Brazilian financial market. Among them, B3 (stock exchange), ANBIMA, CVM e Ilumeo Institute. Following these surveys, Brazil defined action plans, the National Strategy about Financial Education (ENEF).

Academic research

Accounting literacy 
The 1999 Blue Ribbon Committee on Improving the Effectiveness of Corporate Audit Committees recommended that publicly traded companies have at least three members with "a certain basic 'financial literacy'. Such 'literacy' signifies the ability to read and understand fundamental financial statements, including a company's balance sheet, income statement and cash flow statement."

Academic researchers have explored the relationship between financial literacy and accounting literacy. In this context Roman L. Weil defines financial literacy as "the ability to understand the important accounting judgments management makes, why management makes them, and how management can use those judgments to manipulate financial statements".

Critical financial literacy 

Some financial literacy researchers have raised questions about the political character of financial literacy education, arguing that it justifies the shifting of greater financial risk (e.g. tuition fees, pensions, health care costs, etc.) to individuals from corporations and governments. Many of these researchers argue for a financial literacy education that is more critically oriented and broader in focus: an education that helps individuals better understand systemic injustice and social exclusion, rather than one which understands financial failure as an individual problem and the character of financial risk as apolitical. Many of these researchers work within social justice, critical pedagogy, feminist and critical race theory paradigms.

See also 
 Financial deepening
 Financial ethics
 Financial inclusion
 Financial literacy curriculum
 Financial Literacy Month
 Financial regulation
 Financial social work
 Information literacies

References

Further reading

External links
 Money Smart Financial Education Program from the Federal Deposit Insurance Corporation, available at Wikimedia Commons

Personal finance education
Financial economics
OECD